Thorp Arch is a village near Wetherby in West Yorkshire, England. 

Thorp Arch may also refer to:

 Thorp Arch (training ground), the location of the academy and training pitches of Leeds United A.F.C.
 Thorp Arch railway station
 ROF Thorp Arch, a former World War II Royal Ordnance Factory near the village of Thorp Arch
Thorp Arch Trading Estate, an industrial estate on the site of ROF Thorp Arch